The Neruch is a river in Oryol Oblast in Russia, a left tributary of the Zusha.

References

Rivers of Oryol Oblast